City Hall (formerly the Council House) has been the seat of local government in Bristol, United Kingdom, since 1956 (before then the seat was in the Old Council House on Corn Street).  It is situated on College Green, opposite the Cathedral and at the foot of Park Street in Bristol city centre.  Throughout its history it has been home to Bristol City Council. Designed in the 1930s but built after the Second World War, it is a grade II* listed building.

Building

The building was commissioned to replace the Old Council House, Bristol. The new building was designed by Vincent Harris in a concrete frame, clad with very wide, thin bricks, with Portland stone dressings and a leaded hipped roof in a Neo-Georgian style. The steep and high roof with gilded unicorns to the corners of the end blocks.

The foundation stone for the Council House was laid in 1938 and, although completed in 1952, the building was only opened by Queen Elizabeth II on 17 April 1956. The ceremonial entrance overlooks the moat and leads into the reception hall which is lined with local Doulting stone and paved with black and white Italian marble. It also features a blue and gold wall clock, encircled by the signs of the zodiac and equipped with its own wind indicator. The Conference Hall is the largest room in the building. The names of all Mayors and Lord Mayors of Bristol since 1216 are cut into the stone walls. The walls of the Lord Mayor's Reception Room are panelled in English walnut and there is a colourful frieze displaying the heraldry of the Bristol trade guilds, and, in gold leaf, the names of famous Bristolians.

The building was formerly known as the Council House, but was renamed by George Ferguson, CBE, the Mayor of Bristol, on his first day in office to City Hall, on 19 November 2012.

Features

The ceiling of the council chamber was designed by John Armstrong (1893–1973) and depicts buildings in Bristol at the edge and the centre details sailing ships from different periods of Bristol History. The four corners show the allegorical figures of Enterprise, Wisdom, Industry and Navigation. The ceiling in the Conference Room is by Sir Walter Thomas Monnington (1902–1976) on the theme of molecular and atomic fusion.

In 2005, a bust of Tony Benn, the famous Labour Party politician and the Member of Parliament for the former Bristol South East constituency from 1950 to 1960, and again from 1963 to 1983, was unveiled by Benn himself in the building's foyer.

Environmental aspects

Refurbishment of the electrical and heating systems have incorporated the use of rainwater recycling for flushing toilets and an air-conditioning system that will discharge excess heat into the surrounding water filled moat rather than expelling it into the atmosphere.

Popular culture

One of the building's gilded unicorns appears in the opening credits of the first and fifth series of popular television show, Skins.
One of the unicorns also features in a hologram on the latest edition of the £B10 banknote of the Bristol Pound.

References

Bristol, Council House
Grade II* listed buildings in Bristol
Government buildings completed in 1952
Buildings by Vincent Harris